New York's 35th congressional district was a congressional district for the United States House of Representatives in New York. It was created in 1903 as a result of the 1900 Census. It was eliminated as a result of the redistricting cycle after the 1980 Census. It was last represented by Barber B. Conable, Jr. who was redistricted into the 30th District.

Past components
1973–1983:
All of Genesee, Livingston, Wyoming
Parts of Monroe, Ontario
1971–1973:
All of Chenango, Cortland, Madison
Parts of Onondaga
1963–1971:
All of Cayuga, Chenango, Cortland, Montgomery, Ontario, Otsego, Seneca, Yates
1953–1963:
All of Onondaga
1945–1953:
All of Oneida, Oswego
1913–1945:
All of Cortland, Onondaga
1903–1913:
Parts of Buffalo

List of members representing the district

Election results
The following chart shows historic election results. Bold type indicates victor. Italic type indicates incumbent.

References
 
 
 Congressional Biographical Directory of the United States 1774–present
 Election Statistics 1920–present Clerk of the House of Representatives

35
Former congressional districts of the United States
Constituencies established in 1903
Constituencies disestablished in 1983
1903 establishments in New York (state)
1983 disestablishments in New York (state)